Ahatanhel Yukhymovych Krymsky (– 25 January 1942) was a Ukrainian Orientalist, linguist, polyglot (knowing up to 35 languages), literary scholar, folklorist, writer, and translator. He was one of the founders of the All-Ukrainian Academy of Sciences (VUAN) in 1918 and a full member of it and of the Shevchenko Scientific Society from 1903.

Although Krymsky had no Ukrainian origin he described himself as "Ukrainophile".

In 1941, he was arrested by the Soviet authorities as "Ukrainian nationalist," an "ideologist of Ukrainian nationalists," and a "head of nationalistic underground". He was convicted in "Anti-Soviet nationalistic activities" and imprisoned in Kustanay General Prison No.7 (today near Kostanay, Kazakhstan).

Life and career 
Krymsky was born in Volodymyr-Volynskyi to a Tatar father with Belarusian descent and an ethnic Polish mother. In 1915 in interview to the Terciman newspaper, Krymsky identified himself as a Crimean Tatar. His surname "Krymsky" means "Crimean," and was received by an ancestor in the 17th century who was a Crimean Tatar mullah from Bakhchysarai. He was baptized into Eastern Orthodoxy.

His family moved soon to Zvenyhorodka in Central Ukraine.

Krymsky graduated from Galagan College in Kyiv in 1889, from the Lazarev Institute of Oriental Languages in Moscow in 1891, and subsequently from Moscow University in 1896. After graduation, he worked in the Middle East from 1896 to 1898, and subsequently returned to Moscow, where he became a lecturer at the Lazarev Institute, and, in 1900, a professor. Krymsky taught Arabic literature and Oriental history. In Moscow, he was active in the Ukrainian pro-independence movement and was a member of Moscow's Ukrainian Hromada.

In July 1918, Krymsky returned to Kyiv and took part in the foundation of the National Academy of Sciences of Ukraine (VUAN). Eventually, he became the director of the academy. He edited 20 of the 25 volumes of Записки Історично-філологічного відділу ("Notes of the History and Philology Department") of the academy (1920–29) and was a professor at Kyiv University, as well as vice-president of the Ukrainian Science Society in Kyiv from 1918.

Activity 
Krymsky was an expert in up to 34 languages; some sources report that he had at least an average knowledge of 56 languages. Krymsky contributed few hundred entries to the Brockhaus, Efron, and Granat Russian encyclopedias and wrote many other works on Arabic, Turkish, Turkic, Crimean Tatar, and Iranian history and literature, some of which were pioneering textbooks in Russian Oriental studies.

In particular he wrote, in Russian, histories of Islam (1904–12); of the Arabs, Turkey, Persia and their literatures, Dervish theosophy, and a study of the Semitic languages and peoples. In the 1920s and 1930s he also wrote in Ukrainian histories of Turkey and Persia and their literatures; monographs on Hafiz and his songs and on the Turkic peoples, their languages, and literatures; and edited a collection of articles on the Crimean Tatars. With O. Boholiubsky he wrote a study of Arab higher education and the Arabian Academy of Sciences. During the last years of his life he wrote a six-volume history of the Khazars, which was never published.

In Kyiv until 1931, under the leadership of Krymsky, the Turkological Commission at the Ukrainian Academy of Sciences published "History of Turkey", "History of Turkey and its Literature", "Introduction to the History of Turkey", "Turks, their language and literature" and others.

Krymsky researched the history of the Ukrainian language. As he was an opponent of Aleksei Sobolevsky's claim that the language of the ancient Kyivan Rus’ was more Russian, than Ukrainian, he wrote three polemical studies from 1904 to 1907 on this question, later his views on the language of the Kyivan Rus were summarized in Українська мова, звідкіля вона взялася і як розвивалася ("The Ukrainian Language: Whence It Came and How It Developed"). Krymsky researched Ukrainian dialects and was actively involved in the work of standardizing the vocabulary and orthography of literary Ukrainian in the 1920s. In this activity he rejected the Galician orthographic tradition. He was the editor of the first two vols of the four-volume Russian-Ukrainian dictionary (1924–33) and of the Russian-Ukrainian dictionary of legal language (1926).

Krymsky wrote three books of lyrical poetry and some novellas, and translated many Arabic and Persian literary works into Ukrainian, including The Rubáiyát of Omar Khayyam, One Thousand and One Nights, and Hafez's songs. He also translated the poetry of European writers such as Heinrich Heine, Byron, Sappho, Friedrich Rückert. He published articles and reviews on Ukrainian writers, their works and on Ukrainian theater.

As an ethnographer, Krymsky was an adherent of migration theory. He translated into Ukrainian and annotated W.A. Clouston's Popular Tales and Fictions (1896) and also wrote many Orientalist works and articles about Ukrainian ethnographers.

Death 

Although Krymsky survived the Great Purge of the 1930s, he was removed from scholarly and teaching activity for about 10 years. Since 1930, the works of Krymsky were banned and he was forbidden to publish his works. In 1939, he was rehabilitated, but in July 1941 after the German-Soviet war began, the NKVD arrested him as "especially unreliable" on charges of "anti-Soviet nationalistic activities", and imprisoned him in Kostanay General Prison, where he died at the age of 71. Officially, Krymsky died from exhaustion in a prison hospital, but there is a version that he might have died due to cruel torture. His case was finally discontinued in 1957 and he was officially rehabilitated in 1960. Some manuscripts of his works are still unpublished.

References 
Notes

Bibliography
  Гурницький, К. Кримський як історик (Київ, 1971)
 Скокан, К.; Деркач, Н.; Ісаєва, Н,; Мартиненко, Г. Агатангел Кримський: Бібліографічний покажчик (1889–1971) (Київ, 1972)
 Білодід, І. Агатангел Кримський — україніст та орієнталіст (Київ, 1974)
 Павличко, Соломея. Націоналізм, сексуальність, орієнталізм: Складний світ Агатангела Кримського (Київ, 2000)
 Babyshkin, O. Ahatanhel Kryms’kyi: Literaturnyi portret (Kiev 1967)
 Krymsky's works in E-library "Chtyvo"

1871 births
1942 deaths
People from Volodymyr-Volynskyi
People from Zvenyhorodka
People from Volhynian Governorate
People from the Russian Empire of Polish descent
Full Members of the National Academy of Sciences of Ukraine
Ukrainian people in the Russian Empire
Crimean Tatar people
Ukrainian people of Polish descent
Soviet people of Polish descent
Ukrainian ethnographers
Ukrainianists
Linguists from Ukraine
Ukrainian male poets
Ukrainian orientalists
Russian orientalists
Semiticists
Iranologists
Ukrainian Arabists
Soviet people of Belarusian descent
Ukrainian people of Belarusian descent
Recipients of the Order of the Red Banner of Labour